NITD008 is an antiviral drug classified as an adenosine analog (a type of nucleoside analog). It was developed as a potential treatment for flavivirus infections and shows broad spectrum antiviral activity against many related viruses such as dengue virus, West Nile virus, yellow fever virus, Powassan virus, hepatitis C virus, Kyasanur Forest disease virus, Omsk hemorrhagic fever virus, and Zika virus. However, NITD008 proved too toxic in pre-clinical animal testing to be suitable for human trials, but it continues to be used in research to find improved treatments for emerging viral diseases.

See also 
 Favipiravir, a drug approved by China, Germany, Indonesia, Iran, Japan, Thailand, and Turkey for treating COVID-19 patients
 MK-608, a drug with a similar structure
 Remdesivir , FDA approved antiviral drug with a similar structure
 Ribavirin, another antiviral drug with teratogenic side effects that was patented by Merck in 1971 and approved by the FDA in 1986

References 

Anti–RNA virus drugs
Nucleosides
Pyrrolopyrimidines
Ethynyl compounds